Maurice Martel (29 October 1936 – 1 December 2015) was a politician in the Canadian province of Quebec. He served in the National Assembly of Quebec from 1966 to 1970 and again from 1976 to 1985, and was a cabinet minister in the governments of René Lévesque and Pierre-Marc Johnson.

Early life and career

Martel was born in Quebec City. He studied pharmaceutical sciences at the University of Montreal, receiving certification in 1963. In the same year, he opened a drugstore in Sorel. He also worked as a news editor for the weekly journal, La Voix métropolitaine. Martel was politically active in his youth, serving as president of the Union Nationale's university students organization in 1962.

Political career

Martel was first elected to the Quebec legislature in the 1966 provincial election, scoring an upset victory over Liberal cabinet minister Gérard Cournoyer in Richelieu. The Union Nationale won a majority government in this election under Daniel Johnson's leadership, and Martel served for the next four years as a government backbencher. On December 23, 1969, and was appointed as parliamentary assistant to the Minister of Social Affairs. He was defeated by Claude Simard when the Liberals were returned to office in the 1970 provincial election.

The Union Nationale organization declined in the 1970s, and Martel joined the Parti Québécois in 1974. He was returned to the National Assembly in the 1976 election as the PQ formed its first majority government under René Lévesque. He served again as parliamentary assistant to the Minister of Social Affairs from 1976 to 1979, and later served as assistant to the Minister of Public Works and Supply (1979–1984) and the Minister of External Trade (1984).

Cabinet minister
Martel was appointed to Levesque's cabinet as Minister of Revenue on December 20, 1984, as part of a larger shuffle that some believed was intended as an appeal to small-town Quebec. In April 1985, he announced that the Quebec Lottery and Racing Board would be authorized to license arcades and conduct criminal background checks on their owners. He was retained as Revenue Minister when Pierre-Marc Johnson succeeded Levesque as Premier of Quebec in 1985, but was defeated by Liberal candidate Albert Khelfa in the 1985 provincial election as the Liberals were again returned to office. He formally stepped down from cabinet with the rest of the Johnson administration on December 12, 1985.

After politics

Martel returned to his pharmacy practice after leaving political life. In 1991, he was president of Sorel's 350th anniversary celebrations.

Electoral record

References

1936 births
French Quebecers
Living people
Parti Québécois MNAs
Politicians from Quebec City